Robnett-Payne House, also known as Payne Hall and The Country Place, is a historic home located at Fulton, Callaway County, Missouri.  It was built in 1857, and is a two-story, three bay, vernacular Greek Revival style frame dwelling.  It has a side gable roof and features a one bay central entrance porch with Gothic style detailing. It was moved to its present location in 1999 and subsequently restored.

The house was listed on the National Register of Historic Places in 1998.

References 

Houses on the National Register of Historic Places in Missouri
Greek Revival houses in Missouri
Gothic Revival architecture in Missouri
Houses completed in 1857
Houses in Callaway County, Missouri
National Register of Historic Places in Callaway County, Missouri
1857 establishments in Missouri